Lloyd Leroy Hendrick (October 30, 1908 – April 25, 1951) was a lawyer in Shreveport, Louisiana, who served from 1940 to 1948 as a member of the Louisiana State Senate from a combined Caddo and DeSoto parish district. His tenure paralleled the administrations of Governors Sam Houston Jones and Jimmie Davis.

Hendrick was born in Natchitoches Parish to Dr. Thaddeus Albert Hendrick (1878-1956) and the former Eva Lena McFerren (1882-1925). Hendrick graduated from Belcher High School in Belcher in Caddo Parish and Tulane University Law School in New Orleans.
 
His stepmother was the former Mary Lillian Harp (1900-2000). Hendrick was married to the former Gladys Pitts (1902-1979).

Political career

Hendrick died in the capital city of Baton Rouge at the age of forty-two.

References

 

 

1908 births
1951 deaths
People from Natchitoches Parish, Louisiana
Politicians from Shreveport, Louisiana
Louisiana lawyers
Louisiana state senators
American military personnel of World War II
Tulane University Law School alumni
Burials in Louisiana
20th-century American politicians
20th-century American lawyers